In mathematics, Voigt notation or Voigt form in multilinear algebra is a way to represent a symmetric tensor by reducing its order. There are a few variants and associated names for this idea: Mandel notation, Mandel–Voigt notation and Nye notation are others found. Kelvin notation is a revival by Helbig of old ideas of Lord Kelvin. The differences here lie in certain weights attached to the selected entries of the tensor. Nomenclature may vary according to what is traditional in the field of application.

For example, a 2×2 symmetric tensor X has only three distinct elements, the two on the diagonal and the other being off-diagonal. Thus it can be expressed as the vector

.

As another example:

The stress tensor (in matrix notation) is given as

In Voigt notation it is simplified to a 6-dimensional vector:

The strain tensor, similar in nature to the stress tensor—both are symmetric second-order tensors --, is given in matrix form as

Its representation in Voigt notation is

The benefit of using different representations for stress and strain is that the scalar invariance

is preserved.

Likewise, a three-dimensional symmetric fourth-order tensor can be reduced to a 6×6 matrix.

Mnemonic rule 
A simple mnemonic rule for memorizing Voigt notation is as follows:

 Write down the second order tensor in matrix form (in the example, the stress tensor)
 Strike out the diagonal
 Continue on the third column
 Go back to the first element along the first row.

Voigt indexes are numbered consecutively from the starting point to the end (in the example, the numbers in blue).

Mandel notation
For a symmetric tensor of second rank

only six components are distinct, the three on the diagonal and the others being off-diagonal. 
Thus it can be expressed, in Mandel notation, as the vector

The main advantage of Mandel notation is to allow the use of the same conventional operations used with vectors,
for example:

A symmetric tensor of rank four satisfying  and  has 81 components in three-dimensional space, but only 36 
components are distinct. Thus, in Mandel notation, it can be expressed as

Applications
The notation is named after physicist Woldemar Voigt & John Nye (scientist).  It is useful, for example, in calculations involving constitutive models to simulate materials, such as the generalized Hooke's law, as well as finite element analysis, and Diffusion MRI.

Hooke's law has a symmetric fourth-order stiffness tensor with 81 components (3×3×3×3), but because the application of such a rank-4 tensor to a symmetric rank-2 tensor must yield another symmetric rank-2 tensor, not all of the 81 elements are independent. Voigt notation enables such a rank-4 tensor to be represented by a 6×6 matrix. However, Voigt's form does not preserve the sum of the squares, which in the case of Hooke's law has geometric significance. This explains why weights are introduced (to make the mapping an isometry).

A discussion of invariance of Voigt's notation and Mandel's notation can be found in Helnwein (2001).

References

See also
 Vectorization (mathematics)
 Hooke's law

Tensors
Mathematical notation
Solid mechanics